"When I Said Goodbye" / "Summer of Love" is a double A-side single released by British pop music group Steps. "When I Said Goodbye" is taken from their second studio album, Steptacular (1999), while "Summer of Love" was a previously unavailable track, later included on their third album, Buzz (2000). Following its release on 3 July 2000, the double A-side peaked at number five in the United Kingdom and number 18 in Ireland.

Critical reception
Can't Stop the Pop described "Summer of Love" as "an obvious nod" to the Latin-pop craze which dominated the charts at the time. They added that "everything about this track is ramped up to the max" and "moves with such pace that you’d scarcely believe it’s almost four minutes long because it zips by in a flash."

Chart performance
"When I Said Goodbye" / "Summer of Love" peaked at number five on the UK Singles Chart and spent 11 weeks in the top 75, two of which were spent in the top 10. It is their earliest single release (and one of only four in the band's original run) not to have reached at least a Silver certification. The single also reached number 18 in Ireland.

Music videos
The video for "When I Said Goodbye" was a black-and-white video shot in Rome, Italy. It features shots of the members singing solemnly. A colour version was released in 2022. In contrast, the video for "Summer of Love" features brightly coloured clothes and energetic dancing. It portrays Steps and their dancers as "good" Steps (colourful and dressed innocently) and "bad" Steps (dressed in leather, with black makeup); in the end, good Steps chase bad Steps away with their dancing.

Track listings
UK CD single
 "When I Said Goodbye" – 3:32
 "Summer of Love" – 3:52
 "Summer of Love" (W.I.P. remix) – 6:38

UK cassette single
 "When I Said Goodbye" – 3:32
 "Summer of Love" – 3:52

Credits and personnel

A-side: "When I Said Goodbye"
Credits are adapted from the liner notes of Steptacular.

Recording
 Recorded at PWL Studios, Manchester, in 1999
 Mixed at PWL Studios, Manchester
 Mastered at Transfermation Studios, London

Vocals
 Lead vocals – Claire Richards, Ian "H" Watkins
 Background vocals – Lisa Scott-Lee, Faye Tozer, Lee Latchford-Evans

Personnel
 Songwriting – Mark Topham, Karl Twigg
 Production – Mark Topham, Karl Twigg, Pete Waterman
 Mixing – Chris McDonnell
 Engineer – Chris McDonnell
 Drums – Chris McDonnell
 Keyboards – Karl Twigg
 Guitar – Mark Topham
 Bass – Mark Topham

A-side: "Summer of Love"
Credits are adapted from the liner notes of Buzz.

Recording
 Recorded at PWL Studios, Manchester in 1999
 Mixed at PWL Studios, Manchester
 Mastered at Transfermation Studios, London

Vocals
 Lead vocals – Claire Richards, Faye Tozer, Lisa Scott-Lee, Ian "H" Watkins
 Background vocals – Lee Latchford-Evans

Personnel
 Songwriting – Mark Topham, Karl Twigg
 Production – Mark Topham, Karl Twigg, Pete Waterman
 Mixing – Steve Price
 Engineer – Tim Speight
 Keyboards  Karl Twigg
 Guitars  Greg Bone
 Bass  Mark Topham

Charts

Weekly charts

Year-end charts

References

1999 songs
2000 singles
Steps (group) songs
Jive Records singles
Pete Waterman Entertainment singles
Songs written by Karl Twigg
Songs written by Mark Topham